Martin Trochta is a Slovak professional ice hockey player who is currently playing for HKm Zvolen in the Slovak Extraliga.

External links

HKM Zvolen players
Living people
Slovak ice hockey forwards
Year of birth missing (living people)
Sportspeople from Liptovský Mikuláš
Slovak expatriate ice hockey players in the Czech Republic